Sleepy Tigers is an EP by Her Space Holiday released July 21, 2008. The title track also appears on the album XOXO, Panda And The New Kid Revival.

Track listing 
"Sleepy Tigers" – 3:29
"Just Another Day" – 3:13
"This Seat Is Definitely Taken" – 3:12
"Same Song Sing Along" – 2:48

2008 EPs
Her Space Holiday albums